Basketball at the 2011 Pan Arab Games took place in Doha, Qatar from December 7 to 22, 2011. In this tournament, 12 teams played in the men's competition, and 8 teams participated in the women's competition.

Results

Men

First phase

Group A

Group B

Group C

Second phase

Group D

Group E

Group F

Group G

Final phase

Placings 11th–12th

Placings 9th–10th

Placings 7th–8th

Placings 5th–6th

Semifinals

Bronze medal game

Gold medal game

Final standing

Women

Final round

Final standing

External links
 Basketball results at the official website

Basketball at the Pan Arab Games
basketball
International basketball competitions hosted by Qatar
2011 in African basketball
2011–12 in Asian basketball